Saint Paul's School (Lam Tin) is a Catholic girls secondary school run by the Sisters of St. Paul de Chartres in  Lam Tin,  Kowloon Hong Kong. 

St. Paul's School (Lam Tin), established in 1970, is a Catholic secondary school run by the Sisters of St. Paul de Chartres.

School's Facilities 

 No. of classroom: 30
 No. of tutorial rooms: 2
 No. of science laboratories: 4
 No. of computer-aided learning room: 1
 No. of multi-media learning center: 1
 No. of Music room: 1
 No. of art room: 1
 No. of cookery room: 1
 No. of needlework room: 1

All the classrooms are equipped with a class library. 
The multi-media learning centre, computer-assisted learning center, study room and school library are open to students during school and non-school days.

External links 

St Paul's School (Lam Tin)

Lam Tin
Girls' schools in Hong Kong
Catholic secondary schools in Hong Kong
Educational institutions established in 1970